Family Rules is an American television sitcom that aired on UPN from March 9 to April 13, 1999.

Synopsis
The series centered on Nate Harrison, a widowered basketball coach at Morgan College in Baltimore, Maryland, who was raising his four daughters – 16-year-old Hope, 15-year-old Ann, 14-year-old C.J., and 11-year-old Lucy.

Cast
Greg Evigan as Nate Harrison
Maggie Lawson as Hope Harrison
Shawna Waldron as Ann Harrison
Andi Eystad as C.J. Harrison
Brooke Garrett as Lucy Harrison
Markus Redmond as Phil Bennett

Episodes

References

External links
 
 

1990s American sitcoms
1999 American television series debuts
1999 American television series endings
UPN original programming
English-language television shows
Television shows set in Baltimore
Television shows featuring puppetry
Television series by The Jim Henson Company